Anne Hollingsworth Wharton (December 15, 1845 – July 29, 1928) was an American writer and historian.

Formative years
Wharton was born in Southampton Furnace, Pennsylvania on December 15, 1845. The daughter of Charles Wharton and Mary McLanahan Boggs, she was also a direct descendant of Robert Wharton, the longest serving mayor of Philadelphia.

Educated at a private school in Philadelphia, she received a Litt. D. from the University of Pennsylvania.

Career
She devoted herself primarily to the study of the social history of the Colonial and Revolutionary periods of the United States, wrote a number of books and magazine articles in this field, and was chosen historian of The National Society of the Colonial Dames of America. She also helped to found the Pennsylvania Society of the Colonial Dames of America. In 1893, she was a judge at the American Colonial Exhibit at the World's Colombian Exposition at Chicago.

She was also involved in genealogy and published The Genealogy of the Wharton Family in 1880. In 1915, the J.E. Lippincott Company published her book, English Ancestral Homes of Noted Americans."

A lifetime member of the Historical Society of Pennsylvania, she also served as vice president of the Browning Society of Philadelphia and was a member of the Pennsylvania Audubon Society.

Illness, death and interment
During the summer of 1928, Wharton fell ill. She died three weeks later, at the age of eighty-three, at her home at 2220 Locust Street in Philadelphia on Sunday, July 29, 1928. Her funeral was held at Philadelphia's historic Christ Church. She was interred at 
The Woodlands Cemetery in the Wharton family's plot.

Works
 St. Bartholomew's Eve (1866)
 The Wharton Family (1880)
 Through Colonial Doorways (1893)
 Colonial Days and Dames (1894)
 A Last Century Maid (1895)
 Life of Martha Washington (1897)
 Heirlooms in Miniatures (1897)
 Salons Colonial and Republican (1900)
 Social Life in the Early Republic (1902)
 An English Honeymoon (1908)
 Italian Days and Ways (1908)
 In Château Land (1911)
 A Rose of Old Quebec (1913)
 English Ancestral Homes of Noted Americans (1915)
 In Old Pennsylvania Towns (1920)

References

External links
 
 
 
 

American biographers
People from Cumberland County, Pennsylvania
1845 births
1928 deaths
American historians
Historians of the Thirteen Colonies
American women historians
American women biographers